John Kerr (15 July 1934 – 18 September 2005) was an Australian rules footballer who played with Footscray in the Victorian Football League (VFL) during the 1950s.

Kerr played as a rover spent six seasons with the Bulldogs. He was one of the best afield in their 1954 Grand Final victory, his 32 possessions was the most by a Footscray player.

References

External links

1934 births
Australian rules footballers from Victoria (Australia)
Western Bulldogs players
Melbourne Football Club players
Western Bulldogs Premiership players
People educated at Melbourne Grammar School
2005 deaths
One-time VFL/AFL Premiership players